Handball Club Nantes is a team from Nantes, France, that plays in the LNH Division 1.

Crest, colours, supporters

Naming history

Club crest

Kits

Sports Hall information

Name: – Palais des Sports de Beaulieu
City: – Nantes
Capacity: – 5500
Address: – 7–9 Rue André Tardieu, 44200 Nantes, France

Honors
EHF Champions League:
Runner Up : 2018

EHF Cup:
Runner Up : 2013, 2016

France Handball League:
Runner Up : 2017, 2020

Coupe de France: 1
Winner : 2017
Runner Up : 2015, 2022

Coupe de la Ligue: 2
Winner : 2015, 2022
Runner Up : 2013, 2017

Trophée des champions: 2
Winner : 2017, 2022
Runner Up : 2016

Team

Current squad
Squad for the 2022–23 season 

Goalkeeper
 1  Ivan Pešić
 16  Viktor Gísli Hallgrímsson
 21  Manuel Gaspar
Left Wingers
7  Valero Rivera (c)
 11  Baptiste Damatrin 
Right Wingers
 14  Pedro Portela
 19  Kauldi Odriozola
Line player
 2  Rubén Marchán
 17  Jérémy Toto
 18  Théo Monar

Left Backs
3  Thibaud Briet
8  Alexandre Cavalcanti
9  Alexander Shkurinskiy
Central Backs
4  Aymeric Minne 
5  Lucas De La Bretèche
 10  Rok Ovniček
Right Backs
6  Linus Persson
 15  Jorge Maqueda

Transfers
Transfers for the 2023–24 season

 Joining
  Julien Bos (RB) (from  Montpellier HB)
  Théo Avelange-Demouge (RW) (from  Dunkerque HGL)

 Leaving
  Linus Persson (RB) (to  GOG Håndbold) 
  Pedro Portela (RW) (to  Sporting CP) ?

European record 

Note All matches ending with a 10–0 or 5–5 results were assessed by the EHF.

Former club members

Notable former players

  Igor Anić (2014–2015)
  Robin Cantegrel (2008–2017)
  Nicolas Claire (2013–2019)
  Théo Derot (2015–2017)
  Frédéric Dole (2007–2013)
  Cyril Dumoulin (2016–2021)
  Rock Feliho (2010–2021)
  Romain Lagarde (2014–2019)
  Aymeric Minne (2019–)
  Olivier Nyokas (2016–2021)
  Mickaël Robin (2021–2022)
  Seufyann Sayad (2009–2014)
  Guillaume Saurina (2017–2018)
  Arnaud Siffert (2011–2013, 2016–2019)
  Nicolas Tournat (2012–2020)
  Audräy Tuzolana (2009–2011)
  Ahmed Hadjali (2009–2010)
  Tahar Labane (2010–2011)
  Matías Schulz (2014–2016)
  Senjamin Burić (2016–2018, 2019–2020)
  Bruno Souza (2008–2011)
  Rodrigo Salinas Muñoz (2015–2016)
  Šime Ivić (2016)
  Jerko Matulić (2016–2018)
  Ivan Pešić (2022–)
  Sebastian Augustinussen (2019–2021)
  Emil Nielsen (2019–2022)
  David Balaguer (2015–2022)
  Alberto Entrerríos (2012–2016)
  Adrià Figueras (2020–2021)
  Javier García Rubio (2013–2014)
  Eduardo Gurbindo (2016–2021)
  Jorge Maqueda (2012–2015, 2022–)
  Rubén Marchán (2021–)
  Kauldi Odriozola (2022–)
  Valero Rivera (2010–2016, 2018–)
  Antonio García Robledo (2019–2020)
  Borja Vidal (2011–2013)
  Dominik Klein (2016–2018)
  Gawain Vincent (2010–2013)
  Attila Borsos (1988–1990)
  Rudolf Faluvégi (2017–2019)
  Viktor Gísli Hallgrímsson (2022–)
  Gunnar Steinn Jónsson (2012–2014)
  Michele Skatar (2010–2014)
  Kiril Lazarov (2017–2022)
  Nemanja Pribak (2010–2012)
  Espen Lie Hansen (2018–2019)
  Alexandre Cavalcanti (2019–)
  Wilson Davyes (2014–2015)
  Pedro Portela (2021–)
  Vitaly Komogorov (2015–2016)
  Alexander Shkurinskiy (2021–)
  Uroš Bundalo (2016)
  Rok Ovniček (2019–)
  Gorazd Škof (2013–2016)
  Milan Milić (2020–)
  Dragan Pechmalbec (2012–2022)
  Stefan Vujić (2013–2014)
  Kim Ekdahl du Rietz (2011–2012)
  Linus Persson (2021–)
  Mahmoud Gharbi (2010–2017)
  Hatem Haraket (2008–2010)
  Marouen Maggaiz (2008–2014)
  Aymen Toumi (2013–2015)

Former coaches

References

External links
 
 

French handball clubs
Sport in Nantes